Joseph Henry Bottum (August 7, 1903July 4, 1984) was an American politician. He served as the 27th Lieutenant Governor of South Dakota and as a member of the United States Senate from South Dakota.

Early life

Bottum was born in Faulkton, South Dakota and was educated in the public schools of Faulkton. His paternal grandfather, Henry C. Bottum, had been a member of the Wisconsin State Assembly, his maternal grandfather, Darius S. Smith, had been a member of the South Dakota Senate and his father, Joseph H. Bottum, was also a member of the South Dakota Senate. He attended Yankton College and the University of South Dakota (1920–1921). He graduated from the law school of the University of South Dakota in Vermillion in 1927. He was admitted to the bar in 1927 and commenced the practice of law in St. Paul, Minnesota, and later, Faulkton, South Dakota.

Career
Shortly after beginning his legal practice in Faulkton, Bottum was elected Faulk County State's Attorney in 1932, and was re-elected in 1934. He was appointed State Director of Taxation in 1937. In 1942, Bottum unsuccessfully ran for Governor, losing the Republican primary to Merrell Q. Sharpe. Bottum resigned from state government in 1943 to accept a position with the Board of Economic Warfare. In 1944, Bottum resigned from the Board and successfully ran for Pennington County State's Attorney; he was re-elected in 1946. In 1948, Bottum was elected Chairman of the Republican Party of South Dakota. In 1950, Bottum ran for Congress from South Dakota's 2nd congressional district, but lost in the Republican primary to Ellis Berry.

He was elected Lieutenant Governor of South Dakota in 1960, and served in Governor Archie M. Gubbrud's administration from 1961 to 1962. In 1962, following the death of U.S. Senator Francis H. Case, Governor Gubbrud appointed him to the Senate for the remainder of Case's term; separately, the state Republican Party named him as the replacement for Case on the ballot in the 1962 election. Case faced former U.S. Congressman George McGovern in the general election, and narrowly lost re-election, falling short by just 597 votes, or 0.23% of the vote.

Judicial service
The son of Joseph Henry Bottum Sr. (1853–1946), circuit judge in Faulkton, South Dakota, from 1911 to 1942, Bottum followed his father onto the court, serving from 1965 to 1980 as a South Dakota circuit judge. Among the trials over which he presided was the controversial prosecution of the Native American activist Russell Means by then-Attorney General Bill Janklow.

Death and legacy
Bottum was a resident of Rapid City, South Dakota, until his death. He is interred at Pine Lawn Cemetery in Rapid City, South Dakota.

References

External links

1903 births
1984 deaths
Politicians from Rapid City, South Dakota
Lieutenant Governors of South Dakota
South Dakota state court judges
District attorneys in South Dakota
People from Faulkton, South Dakota
Yankton College alumni
University of South Dakota School of Law alumni
Republican Party United States senators from South Dakota
South Dakota Republicans
20th-century American lawyers
20th-century American politicians
20th-century American judges